Last Call is a song by Dave Van Ronk, originally released on his album Songs For Ageing Children in 1973, and released in a different version on Going Back To Brooklyn in 1994, and is one of the few songs he has written.

Van Ronk claims that he woke up one morning after a night of drinking with Leonard Cohen and Joni Mitchell, and the lyrics to this song were written on a piece of paper. Neither of them admitted to writing it, so he had to assume that he had

In popular culture 
Crime writer Lawrence Block took the title of his Matthew Scudder novel When the Sacred Ginmill Closes (1986) from the lyrics to the song:

And so we’ve had another night 
of poetry and poses,
and each man knows he’ll be alone
when the sacred ginmill closes.

A key scene in the novel has ex-cop Scudder listening to the song late one night in the studio apartment of a bartender as they drink their lives away, and the song serves as a structural and philosophical theme for the book.

References

1973 songs